Consumers Association of Penang (CAP) is a Malaysian NGO focused on the promotion of consumer awareness and consumer rights in Malaysia. It was founded in 1969.

See also 
Sahabat Alam Malaysia

References 

Non-governmental organizations
Organisations based in Malaysia